Andrei Grigoryevich Ilyaskin (born 25 July 1967) is a Russian professional football coach and a former player. He made his professional debut in the Soviet First League in 1984 for Lokomotiv Moscow.

Honours
 Soviet Cup runner-up: 1990 (played in the early stages of the 1989/90 tournament for FC Lokomotiv Moscow).

References

1967 births
Living people
Soviet footballers
Russian footballers
Association football midfielders
Russian Premier League players
Russian expatriate footballers
Expatriate footballers in Poland
Expatriate footballers in Belarus
Russian expatriate sportspeople in Poland
FC Lokomotiv Moscow players
FC Dynamo Bryansk players
FC Kuban Krasnodar players
Polonia Warsaw players
PFC CSKA Moscow players
FC Shinnik Yaroslavl players
FC Rubin Kazan players
FC Fakel Voronezh players
FC Slavia Mozyr players
Russian football managers
FC Dynamo Vologda players
FC Iskra Smolensk players
FC Znamya Truda Orekhovo-Zuyevo players